The Brook Brothers were an English pop duo composed of Geoff Brook (born Geoffrey Owen Brooks, 12 April 1943, Winchester, Hampshire) and Ricky Brook (born Richard Alan Brooks, 24 October  1940, Winchester, Hampshire).

The Brook Brothers started out as a skiffle group in 1956 but, after winning a television talent show, changed their look and sound to approximate the style of The Everly Brothers. They signed to Top Rank Records in 1960 and released a cover of the song "Greenfields" by The Brothers Four the same year. The tune was a hit in Italy but attracted little notice in their home country. After a few more singles were released, they switched to Pye Records, and their second release for them, "Warpaint" (written by Howard Greenfield and Barry Mann), became a UK Top 5 hit. 

Following the single's success they released a full-length album and toured with Cliff Richard and Bobby Rydell. They took part in the annual NME Readers' Poll-Winners Concert at London's Wembley Pool on 15 April 1962. They were produced by a young Tony Hatch, and made an appearance in the film, It's Trad, Dad!. They also entered A Song For Europe for the Eurovision Song Contest 1962, but did not advance in the contest.

After their last chart hit, "Trouble Is My Middle Name", in 1963, the group's popularity faded, and they left public view by 1965. Their entire Pye recordings were reissued on CD by Castle Music in the 1990s.

Singles
1960 "Greenfields" – Top Rank
1960 "Please Help Me I'm Falling" b/w "When Will I Be Loved?" – Top Rank
1961 "Warpaint" b/w "Sometimes" – Pye 7N 15333 – UK #5
1961 "Little Bitty Heart" b/w "Tell Her" – Pye 7N 15352
1961 "Ain't Gonna Wash for a Week" – Pye 7N 15369 – UK #13
1962 "He's Old Enough to Know Better" – Pye 7N 15409 – UK #37
1962 "Welcome Home Baby" – Pye 7N 15453 – UK #33
1963 "Trouble Is My Middle Name" – Pye 7N 15498 – UK #38

References

English pop music duos
Pye Records artists
Musical groups established in 1956
1956 establishments in England
Skiffle groups